Cathy Erway is a food blogger (Not Eating Out in New York), cookbook author, and freelance food author.

Her books include The Art of Eating In (2010), The Food of Taiwan (2015), and Sheet Pan Chicken (2020).

Biography
A resident of Brooklyn, Erway graduated from Emerson College. She won the Journalism James Beard Foundation Award in 2019 in the Home Cooking category for her article "The Subtle Thrills of Cold Chicken" for Taste magazine.

References

American cookbook writers
American women bloggers
American bloggers
Emerson College alumni
James Beard Foundation Award winners
Women cookbook writers
Writers from Brooklyn
Year of birth missing (living people)
Living people